Bryans is a surname shared by several notable people, among them being:

 Anne Bryans, deceased British Red Cross staffer
 Bebe Bryans, living American athlete
 Billy Bryans, deceased Canadian musician
 Frank Bryans, deceased Argentine cricketer and tennis player
 John Bryans, deceased British actor
 Lina Bryans, deceased Australian artist
 Lynda Bryans, living Northern Irish television news personality
 Matt Bryans, living British artist
 Ralph Bryans, deceased Northern Irish motorcycle racer
 Robin Bryans, deceased Irish author